Chhadke is a Nepalese film which tells the story about two best friends. The trio all had dreams to fulfill 'when they grew up', but time and destiny seem to have other plans for them

Plot 
This movie is about two politicians who want to be crowned as prime minister but they use gangs to kill each other so they can win.

Cast 
 Nikun Shrestha as Prakash's Friend
 Bipin Karki as Bindu
 Kameshwor Chaurasiya as Jogi
 Saugat Malla as Researcher
 Dayahang Rai as Dawa
 Namrata Shrestha as Soli 
 Prateek Raj Neupane as Taate
 Arpan Thapa as Boksi
 Aruna Karki as Tattoo's Wife
 Robin Tamang as Chewang
 [ Cinematographer] Sanjay Lama
 [ Editor] Dirgha Khadka

References 

2010s Nepali-language films
Nepalese crime films
Nepalese thriller films